Steuben County is a county in the northeast corner of the U.S. state of Indiana. As of the 2010 United States Census the county population was 34,185. The county seat (and only incorporated city) is Angola. Steuben County comprises the Angola, IN Micropolitan Statistical Area.

History
After the American Revolutionary War established US sovereignty over the territory of the upper midwest, the new federal government defined the Northwest Territory in 1787 which included the area of present-day Indiana. In 1800, Congress separated Ohio from the Northwest Territory, designating the rest of the land as the Indiana Territory. President Thomas Jefferson chose William Henry Harrison as the governor of the territory, and Vincennes was established as the capital. After the Michigan Territory was separated and the Illinois Territory was formed, Indiana was reduced to its current size and geography. By December 1816 the Indiana Territory was admitted to the Union as a state.

This area was historically occupied by the Potawatomi people, one of the tribes in the Council of Three Fires. Typically they lived in highly decentralized bands. Treaties signed by some leaders with United States representatives ceded large areas of their territory to the US. Starting in 1794, Native American titles to Indiana lands were extinguished by usurpation, purchase, or war and treaty. The United States acquired land from the Native Americans in the 1809 treaty of Fort Wayne, by the treaty of St. Mary's in 1818, and in 1826 by the Treaty of Mississinewas, which included the future Steuben County.

The Indiana State Legislature passed an omnibus county bill on 7 February 1835 that authorized the creation of thirteen counties in northeast Indiana, including Steuben. In 1837 the county was organized. It was named for Baron Frederick von Steuben, an officer of the American Revolutionary War. In 1840 the Potawatomi were forcibly removed from this area and neighboring territory in Michigan and Ohio to Indian Territory in Kansas.

A Potawatomi chief, Baw Beese, led a band that was based at what later became known as Baw Beese Lake nearby in Michigan. His daughter Winona married Negnaska and lived in what is now Indiana. She was executed in the 1830s by her husband's people after she killed Negnaska for selling her pony. Winona's husband had pledged his rifle to Aaron B. Goodwin of Fremont for the use of a 5-gallon keg. The Indians had the keg filled with whiskey at Nichols' store in Jamestown, and he took all the money they had. Negnaska sold his wife Winona's pony in order to pawn his rifle. Winona owned the pony outright, either as a gift from her father or having bought it with her own money. She killed Negnaska in anger for selling what was hers. Winona was held by the tribe for a few hours until her husband's nearest relative arrived to execute her. As was their custom, he stabbed her to the heart as she had her husband.

John D. Barnard and Sheldon Havens encountered the Potawatomi group after the execution; they helped them move the bodies to a nearby grave that had been dug. The Indians did not bury the bodies until after the white men were out of sight. But Dr. B.F. Sheldon found out about it and exhumed the bodies for dissection a few days later, outraging the mourning Potawatomi. About two weeks later some Potawatomi returned the keg to Goodwin and tried to retrieve Negnaska's rifle, but Goodwin pretended not to know the man had been killed and refused to release the rifle to his friends.

Geography
The county's low rolling hills have been largely cleared and leveled for agricultural use, although the drainage areas are still wooded.

The county contains a state park and 105 lakes of various sizes. Some of the larger lakes are Lake James, Lake George, Clear Lake, Jimmerson Lake, Lake Gage, and Crooked Lake.

Adjacent counties

 Branch County, Michigan - north
 Hillsdale County, Michigan - northeast
 Williams County, Ohio - east
 DeKalb County - south
 Noble County - southwest
 LaGrange County - west

Major highways

    Indiana Toll Road (Interstate 80 and Interstate 90)
  Interstate 69
  U.S. Route 20
  State Road 1
  State Road 120
  State Road 127
  State Road 327
  State Road 427
  State Road 827

City and towns

 Angola (city/county seat)
 Ashley
 Clear Lake
 Fremont
 Hamilton
 Hudson
 Orland

Unincorporated communities

 Alvarado
 Berlien
 Clarks Landing
 Cold Springs
 Courtney Corner
 Crooked Lake
 Ellis
 Flint
 Forest Park
 Fountain Park
 Glen Eden
 Helmer
 Indian Hills
 Inverness
 Island Park
 Jamestown
 Lake James
 Lakeside Park
 Meadow Shores Park
 Metz
 Moonlight
 Nevada Mills
 Oakwood
 Otsego Center
 Page
 Panama
 Penn Park
 Pleasant Lake
 Ravinia Oaks
 Ray
 Russels Point
 Salem Center
 Steubenville
 Turkey Creek
 Westview
 Wildwood
 York

Townships

 Clear Lake
 Fremont
 Jackson
 Jamestown
 Millgrove
 Otsego
 Pleasant
 Richland
 Salem
 Scott
 Steuben
 York

Protected areas
 Cedar Lake Wetlands Conservation Area
 Marsh Lake Wetlands State Fish and Wildlife Area
 Pokagon State Park

Climate and weather

Government

The county government is a constitutional body and is granted specific powers by the Constitution of Indiana, and by the Indiana Code.

County Council: The legislative branch of the county government; controls spending and revenue collection in the county. Representatives are elected to four-year terms from county districts. They set salaries, the annual budget, and special spending. The council has limited authority to impose local taxes, in the form of an income and property tax that is subject to state level approval, excise taxes, and service taxes.

Board of Commissioners: The executive body of the county; commissioners are elected county-wide to staggered four-year terms. One commissioner serves as president. The commissioners execute acts legislated by the council, collect revenue, and manage the county government.

Court: The county maintains a small claims court that handles civil cases. The judge on the court is elected to a term of four years and must be a member of the Indiana Bar Association. The judge is assisted by a constable who is also elected to a four-year term. In some cases, court decisions can be appealed to the state level circuit court.

County Officials: The county has other elected offices, including sheriff, coroner, auditor, treasurer, recorder, surveyor, and circuit court clerk. These officers are elected to four-year terms. Members elected to county government positions are required to declare party affiliations and to be residents of the county.

Steuben County is part of Indiana's 3rd congressional district.

Steuben County is very Republican at the Presidential level. The only time it voted for a Democrat was for Franklin D. Roosevelt in 1932, and it was narrow.

Demographics

2010 Census
As of the 2010 United States Census, there were 34,185 people, 13,310 households, and 9,153 families in the county. The racial makeup of the county was 96.8% white, 0.5% black or African American, 0.5% Asian, 0.3% American Indian, 0.9% from other races, and 0.9% from two or more races. Those of Hispanic or Latino origin made up 2.9% of the population. In terms of ancestry, 37.8% were German, 12.6% were English, 10.5% were Irish, and 8.2% were American.

Of the 13,310 households, 30.4% had children under the age of 18 living with them, 54.3% were married couples living together, 9.3% had a female householder with no husband present, 31.2% were non-families, and 25.3% of all households were made up of individuals. The average household size was 2.47 and the average family size was 2.94. The median age was 40.2 years.

The median income for a household in the county was $47,697 and the median income for a family was $57,154. Males had a median income of $40,833 versus $29,614 for females. The per capita income for the county was $22,950. About 7.7% of families and 10.9% of the population were below the poverty line, including 16.4% of those under age 18 and 6.3% of those age 65 or over.

Education

Colleges and universities 
 Trine University

School districts
 Fremont Community Schools
 Hamilton Community Schools
 M S D of Steuben County
 Prairie Heights Community School Corporation

Notable people
 Edgar "Pop" Buell (1913–1980), humanitarian aid worker in Laos in the 1960s and 1970s, was born in Richland Township and farmed there until he joined International Voluntary Services in 1960.
 Sile Doty (1800-1876), infamous robber, burglar, horse thief, highwayman, counterfeiter, and criminal gang leader.

See also
 The Herald Republican, daily newspaper covering Steuben County
 National Register of Historic Places listings in Steuben County, Indiana

References

External links
 National Register of Historic Places listings in Steuben County, Indiana
 Official Site of Steuben County, Indiana
 Steuben County Tourism Bureau
 Steuben County Community Foundation
 Carnegie Public Library of Steuben County
 Steuben County Genealogical Society

 
Indiana counties
1837 establishments in Indiana
Populated places established in 1837
Sundown towns in Indiana